The sheltopusik  (Pseudopus apodus), also commonly called Pallas's glass lizard the European legless lizard, or the European glass lizard, is a species of large glass lizard found from Southern Europe to Central Asia.

Etymology
Pseudopus apodus comes from Greek ψευδοποδος άποδος, literally meaning "fake-legged" or without legs.

The common name "sheltopusik" comes from Russian желтопузик (zheltopuzik), which translates most directly as "yellow-bellied".

Taxonomy
The sheltopusik was previously included in the genus Ophisaurus, but has since been placed in its own genus Pseudopus. It was originally described in 1775 by Peter Simon Pallas as Lacerta apoda.

There are three subspecies:

 P. a. apodus (Pallas, 1775) - the type subspecies, ranging from Crimea through Transcaucasia, east to Central Asia as far as Kazakhstan 
 P. a. levantinus Jablonski, Ribeiro-Junior, Meiri, Maza, Mikulíček & Janzik, 2021 - restricted to the Levant, from southern Turkey south to Israel & Palestine
 P. a. thracicus (Obst, 1978) - the westernmost subspecies, ranging from Croatia to Greece, east to western Turkey

Despite only being described in 2021, P. a. levantinus is the largest and most genetically diverse of the subspecies, indicating an older and more complex evolutionary history compared to its sister subspecies.

Description
It is tan colored, paler on the ventral surface and the head, with a ring-like/segmented appearance that makes it look like giant earthworm with a distinctive fold of skin down each side called a lateral groove. Small (2-mm) rear legs are sometimes visible near the cloaca. Though the legs are barely discernible, the sheltopusik can be quickly distinguished from a snake by its ears, eyelids, and ventral scales.

Habitat and behaviour
P. apodus inhabits open country, such as short grassland or sparsely wooded hills. It consumes arthropods and small mammals. Snails and slugs appear to be its favorite prey, which may explain why it is particularly active in wet weather, although it prefers a dry habitat. Breaking through the shells of snails is an especially easy task due to their teeth and jaw structure.

Defensive behaviour
Due to its size, the sheltopusik tends to respond to harassment by hissing, biting, and musking. It is less likely to drop off its tail than some other species that display caudal autotomy. However, these occasional displays of caudal autotomy are responsible for the name "glass lizard" (or "glass snake"). The released tail may break into pieces, leading to the myth that the lizard can shatter like glass and reassemble itself later. In reality, if the tail is lost, it grows back slowly, but is shorter and darker. The replacement tail may grow back to full length after an extended period of time.

In captivity
Sheltopusiks are frequently available in the exotic pet trade, though rarely captive-bred. They do not typically tolerate a large amount of handling, but they adapt to captivity well, feeding on crickets, meal worms, small mice, eggs, snails, or pieces of meat. They are even known to accept these meals from a keeper's tweezers, or even from their hands once they become used to captivity.  However, sheltopusiks do get excited around food and have surprisingly powerful jaws. They make hardy captives, capable of living up to 50 years.

Reproduction
About 10 weeks after mating, the female P. apodus lays about eight eggs, which she hides under bark or a stone, and often guards them. The young hatch after 45 to 55 days.

Relationship with humans 
Remains of the Levant subspecies (P. a. levantinus) are known from Natufian sites in Israel, suggesting that it was eaten by the local population at the time.

References

External links

Further reading
Arnold EN, Burton JA (1978). A Field Guide to the Reptiles and Amphibians of Britain and Europe. London: Collins. 272 pp. + Plates 1-40. (Ophisaurus apodus, pp. 175, 178 + Plate 33, figures 1a-1b + Map 94).
Boulenger GA (1885). Catalogue of the Lizards in the British Museum Natural History). Second Edition. Volume II. ... Anguidæ ... London: Trustees of the British Museum (Natural History). (Taylor and Francis, printers). xiii + 497 pp. + Plates I-XXIV. (Ophisaurus apus, new combination, pp. 280–281).
Pallas PS (1775). "Lacerta apoda, descripta ". Novi Comentarii Academiae Scientiarum Imperialis Petropolitanae 19: 435-454 + Plates IX-X. (Lacerta apoda, new species). (in Latin).

Anguids
Legless lizards
Reptiles of Central Asia
Lizards of Asia
Lizards of Europe
Reptiles described in 1775
Taxa named by Peter Simon Pallas
Articles containing video clips